The Make-Up was a Washington, D.C. based band formed in 1995, consisting of Ian Svenonius, James Canty, Steve Gamboa, Michelle Mae, and for a brief period Alex Minoff. During the Make-Up's five years of activity, they released four studio albums, two live albums, a compilation of singles and B-sides, and a number of singles and splits. A posthumous live album was also released in 2006. The band was also the subject of the short film Blue is Beautiful by James Schneider, later repackaged as part of In Film/On Video in 2006.

The Make-Up released records through many independent record labels, most notable among them were Dischord Records, K Records, Southern Records, and their own Black Gemini Records. On their many releases, the Make-Up recorded with producers including Brendan Canty, Calvin Johnson, Guy Picciotto, Royal Trux ("Adam and Eve"), John Loder, and Ian MacKaye.


Albums

Vinyl EPs

7-inch singles
All of the Make-Up's singles and B-sides, with the exception of remixes and versions, were compiled on I Want Some (1999).

Splits

Compilation appearances

DVD / video

See also
 Nation of Ulysses discography
 Weird War discography
 Dischord Records discography

References

General
 
Specific

External links
 
 Discography on Southern Records

Make-Up, The
Rock music group discographies